Emma Padilla (March 8, 1900 – July 2, 1966) was Mexico's first film star.

She was noted for her resemblance to, and copying the mannerisms of, Italian film star Pina Menichelli, particularly in La luz (1917), which was essentially a copy of the successful Italian film Il Fuoco (1915) starring Menichelli.

Selected filmography
 La luz (1917) 
 Hasta después de la muerte (1920)

References

External links

1900 births
1966 deaths
Mexican film actresses
Mexican silent film actresses
Actresses from Mexico City
20th-century Mexican actresses